Shaukat Ali Khan  (1879 - 27 August 1941), better known as Fani Badayuni (his takhallus), was an Indian Urdu poet.

Early life
He was schooled at Government High School and graduated from Bareilly College in 1901, studied law at Aligarh Muslim University, earning L.L.B. degree in 1906.

Career
Badayuni started composing poetry around twenty years of age.

In Hyderabad
Badayuni migrated to Hyderabad, India after the Nizam's diwan Maharaja Kishan Prasad 'Shad', an Urdu lover and poet, got Fani appointed in the department of education.

Bibliography
His first collection of poems was published in 1917 from Badaun by Naqib Press. His other published works are:

 Baqiyat-e-Fani (1926) published by Maktab-e-Agra
 Irfaniyat-e-Fani (1938) published by Anjuman Taraqqi Urdu
 Fani ki nadir tahriren: Havashi, tasrihat aur tanqidi ja'ize ke sath by Shaukat Ali Khan Fani Badayuni (1968)
 Intikhab-i Fani (Silsilah-yi matbu°at) by Shaukat °Ali Khan Fani Badayuni
 Irfaniyat-i-Fani: Ya'ni Janab Shaukat Ali Khan Sahib Fani Badayuni ke qadim-o-jadid kalam ka mukammal majmu'ah (Silsilah-e-Anjuman-e
 Taraqqi Urdu) by Shaukat Ali Khan Fani Badayuni (1939)
 Kulliyat-i Fani (Silsilah-e-matbu'at) by Shaukat Ali Khan Fani Badayuni (1992)

See also

 List of Indian Urdu poets
 List of Indian poets

References

Further reading
 Fani Badayuni (Urdu writer) by Mughni Tabassum, pp. 92 (1993)
 Jadid Urdu Shairi by Abdl Qadir Sarwari (1946)
 Tareekh-o-tanqeed Adabiyat-e-Urdu by Hamid Husain Qadri (1947) Agra
 A History of Urdu Literature by Muhammad Sadiq-(1967)
 A detailed account of Fani's personal life can be found in the Urdu book Durbaar-e-Durbaar, by Sadq Jaisi and in the English translation (The Nocturnal Court) of the same book by Narendra Luther.

External links

Fani Badayuni at Kavita Kosh (Hindi font)
Fani Badayuni at Urdupoetry.com

1879 births
1961 deaths
Indian male poets
Urdu-language poets from India
20th-century Indian Muslims
Writers from Hyderabad, India
People from Budaun
Faculty of Law, Aligarh Muslim University alumni
19th-century Indian poets
20th-century Indian poets
Poets from Uttar Pradesh
19th-century Indian male writers
20th-century Indian male writers
Writers in British India